Matt Murray (born May 2, 1966) is an American journalist. He was the editor in chief of The Wall Street Journal from 2018 until 2023.

Education
Murray earned bachelor's and master's degrees in journalism from Northwestern University.

Career
Murray has been a reporter at the Journal since 1994.  He began in the Pittsburgh bureau, and joined the  money and investing section in 1997, covering banking. He was deputy managing editor, then executive editor.

Editor in chief
On June 5, 2018, Murray was named editor in chief, succeeding Gerard Baker, and assumed his new role on June 11.

As editor in chief, Murray oversaw the Wall Street Journal investigations into Michael Cohen and the Stormy Daniels–Donald Trump scandal that led to the Journals Pulitzer win in 2019.

In February 2020, amid backlash from the Chinese government regarding the headline of a Wall Street Journal opinion piece, Murray agreed with the complaints but could not take any action due to the separation between news and opinion at the paper.

In the wake of the murder of George Floyd and subsequent protests, journalists at the Journal sent multiple letters to Murray lamenting the paper's lack of diversity as well as demanding changes to the way the paper covers race, policing and finance.

Murray was reported to have a strained relationship with Almar Latour, Dow Jones CEO, which publishes The Wall Street Journal. He was replaced as editor in chief by British journalist Emma Tucker on February 1, 2023.

Books
Murray is the author of The Father and the Son and the co-author of Strong of Heart.

Personal life
He married Janine Dyck Flory, PhD, in October 2002. They live with their daughter in New York City.

References

Living people
Northwestern University alumni
The Wall Street Journal people
Place of birth missing (living people)
21st-century American newspaper editors
1966 births